Storms in May (German: Gewitter im Mai) is a 1904 novel by the German writer Ludwig Ganghofer.

Adaptations
It has been adapted twice for film. A 1920 silent film Storms in May and a 1938 sound film Storms in May directed by Hans Deppe and starring Viktor Staal and Hansi Knoteck. A 1987 television film with Claudia Messner and Gabriel Barylli was directed by Xaver Schwarzenberger.

References

Bibliography
 Goble, Alan. The Complete Index to Literary Sources in Film. Walter de Gruyter, 1999.

1904 German novels
German novels adapted into films
Novels by Ludwig Ganghofer